The Swagap tribe belong to the indigenous tribes of Papua New Guinea. They are also known as the Insect Tribe. They speak the Nggala language (also called Swagap or Sogap), which is one of the Sepik languages belonging to the Ndu branch.

Homelife
The tribe lives in a village that sits above the waters of the Sepik River, named Sawagap. The tribe live off fish and other animals that they hunt in the jungle, but their chief source of income comes from crocodile skin.

Religious beliefs

They worship the praying mantis.

Discovery and outside contact

They were unknown to the outside world until the 1950s.

More recently, they were the subject of a documentary by Donal MacIntyre in 2007, in which six members of the tribe, including their chief, Joseph, were flown to London as part of the special Return of the Tribe.

Sources

Further reading
http://www.tvthrong.co.uk/return-of-the-tribe
 The jungle VIPs

Ethnic groups in Papua New Guinea
Tribes of Oceania